Altbayern (Bavarian: Oidbayern, also written Altbaiern, English: "Old Bavaria") is the territory and people of the three oldest parts of the Free State of Bavaria, which were earlier known as Kurbayern (English: "Electoral Bavaria") after the former Electorate of Bavaria.

Altbayern mainly consists of the following Bavarian Regierungsbezirke (administrative regions):
 Upper Bavaria (Oberbayern) 
 Lower Bavaria (Niederbayern)
 Upper Palatinate (Oberpfalz)

Since the term Altbayern is based on the cultural difference compared to Franconia (i.e. Upper, Middle and Lower Franconia) as well as with Swabia (i.e. Bavarian Swabia), some areas surrounding the Upper Franconian town of Wunsiedel as well as the Swabian Aichach-Friedberg district are counted as part of Altbayern, because they share the same history, dialect and culture as the three previously mentioned districts. Strictly speaking, the Upper Austrian Innviertel also belongs to Altbayern, since it was part of the Bavarian electorate until it was attached to the Archduchy of Austria according to the 1779 Treaty of Teschen.

The State of "Baiern" has been called "Bayern" since the reign of King Ludwig I (1825-1848). With the beginning of his reign 1825 the official spelling of Bavaria was changed from "Baiern" to "Bayern", firstly  because of the king's love for Ancient Greek culture , and secondly to reflect the recent addition of vast swathes of originally non-Bavarian areas (Swabians + Franconians). Ideally, the term "Baiern" would be a logical description for the "Altbayern" region, but since there is no difference in sound between the words "Baiern" and "Bayern" and there is still a great danger of confusing them in writing, the term "Altbayern" is used.

The Franconian and Swabian territories were not merged into the Kingdom of Bavaria until the German mediatisation and the 1815 Congress of Vienna, hence they still have strong cultural as well as linguistic differences from Altbayern. Bavarian dialects are spoken in Altbayern (and in the adjacent Austrian lands), as distinct from East Franconian and Alemannic (Swabian) in the Franconian regions and Bavarian Swabia.

On Bayerischer Rundfunk television a regular program called "Schwaben & Altbayern" discusses current political and cultural topics of Bavaria's southern regions.

References

The information in this article is based on a translation of its German equivalent.

Regions of Bavaria